Dark Towers is a 1981 educational production by the BBC in the Look and Read series. The series remains highly popular in primary schools to this day. Parts of the film were shot at Sutton Court, Somerset.

The show involves two main characters; Tracy and Edward. They go about their mission to stop a group, led by Miss Hawk, from stealing the treasures of Dark Towers.

Cast 

 Juliet Waley as Tracey Brown
 Gary Russell as Lord Edward Dark
 David Collings as Lord Dark / The Friendly Ghost
 Christopher Biggins as Benger
 Harry Jones as Bunce
 Juliet Hammond (credited as Juliet Hammond-Hill) as Miss Hawk
 Peter Mayhew as The Tall Knight

Episodes 

Part One (Dark Towers in Danger!): A loner named Tracey Brown and her dog Towser venture into a garden where Tracey meets Lord Edward Dark, who agrees to help her look for Towser. Tracey's search leads her into Dark Towers where she meets Edward's father, Lord Dark. Tracey eventually finds Towser barking at a picture on the wall. The picture comes to life and cries out that the house is in danger, and that the girl (Tracey) will save the house, but Edward and his father do not hear the voice.

Part Two (The Man in the Picture):  Tracey and Edward encounter two men, Benger and Bunce, and soon become suspicious of the two. When they follow Towser to the Red Bedroom, they meet the Friendly Ghost, who is the man in the picture that spoke.

Part Three (The Old Legend): The Friendly Ghost tells Tracey and Edward the legend of Dark Towers, of the Tall Knight, his treasure, and gives them this warning: "Beware of Two B's Buzzing Together. Beware of the Bird with the brown feather".

Part Four (The Clue in the Book): After the Friendly Ghost disappears, a woman named Miss Hawk walks into the Red Bedroom, and offers to help Tracey and Edward look for the treasure. Tracey and Edward find a clue which tells them to "Go where old wheels go round".

Part Five (The Old Coach House): Following the clue, Tracey searches the Old Coach House where she discovers Benger and Bunce are crooks, and overhears their plans.

Part Six (The Tall Knight's Folly): Tracey is literally framed by Benger and Bunce (they stuffed a little gold picture into her pocket at the end of the previous episode), and she is sent away by Lord Dark. Edward finds a torn piece of paper in the Old Coach House. He seeks help from the Friendly Ghost, and learns that Benger and Bunce were the "two B's" the ghost warned him about. Reading the clue, Edward and the Ghost come to the conclusion that the next clue ("think of a knight so tall, haunting the end of a wall") is at the Tall Knight's Folly at the end of the old wall. Edward goes there, and meets the Tall Knight who demands to know "Who comes to the Tall Knight's Folly?".

Part Seven (The Dark Tree): Edward asks the Tall Knight for his help, but he says he can't help unless Tracey and Towser are there, because the old legend involves a boy, a girl, and a dog, and he vanishes. Luckily, Tracey and Towser are still hanging around, and they meet up with Edward after Towser drags her to the folly. The Tall Knight appears again, and instructs them to "go to the old library, and a gold key you will see, inside the inside of the Dark tree".  While trying to crack the Tall Knight's riddle, Edward realises that he meant the Dark Family Tree, and they find the final clue, which falls out of the spine of the book. The clue reads: "The knight's treasure will rest inside the inside of a studded chest".

Part Eight (Beware of the Bird!): Edward asks his father if they have a studded chest, and he says there is one in the Old Tower. Miss Hawk overhears. Edward looks at the picture of the Friendly Ghost, and the ghost repeats his warning: "Beware of the bird with the brown feather", adding, "the hawk who hunts treasure". Edward now knows Miss Hawk is the bird with the brown feather, and rushes off to find Tracey. They head up to the Old Tower, opening the chest with the key that came with the last clue. It's empty. Benger and Bunce suddenly arrive with Miss Hawk. Bunce puts Tracey in the back of his and Benger's van, and drives off, but the Tall Knight comes to Tracey's rescue. (A similar plot later is also in Part Eight of the later Look and Read story Badger Girl, also by Andrew Davies, where the protagonists are taken away in a van)

Part Nine (Who Can Help?):  Bunce abandons his van and runs back to Dark Towers. Meanwhile, Miss Hawk has her own ghostly encounter in the Red Bedroom where she is keeping Edward, who now knows Miss Hawk wants the Golden Book of the Tall Knight for herself. The Friendly Ghost appears, and Miss Hawk runs from the Red Bedroom screaming. The baddies all discover the Golden Book of the Tall Knight hidden inside the lid of the studded chest, and the Friendly Ghost tries to summon the Tall Knight.

Part Ten (The Last Laugh): Tracey arrives back at Dark Towers as darkness falls, meaning that the Tall Knight will soon appear. She convinces Lord Dark she is innocent, and he calls the police. Miss Hawk snatches the Golden Book of the Tall Knight and splits as all of Dark Towers plunges into darkness. Benger and Bunce go after her. As Tracey, Towser, Edward, and Lord Dark emerge from Dark Towers, the Tall Knight arrives, and scares the bad guys witless. As Benger, Bunce, and Miss Hawk are arrested, and the darkness lifts, Tracey gives Lord Dark the Golden Book of the Tall Knight. The Tall Knight has vanished, but throughout the house are strange sounds like laughter. The ghosts of Dark Towers are having the last laugh.

External links
Information on Dark Towers

1981 British television series debuts
1981 British television series endings
1980s British children's television series
BBC children's television shows
British television shows for schools
Look and Read
English-language television shows
Reading and literacy television series